Tazehabad (also Romanized as Tāzehābād) is a village in Kheyrud Kenar Rural District, in the Central District of Nowshahr County, Mazandaran Province, Iran. At the 2006 census, its population was 2,735, in 737 families.

References 

Populated places in Nowshahr County